Arthur William Patton (1916–1990) was an Australian rugby league footballer who played in the 1930s and 1940s, and later became a coach and administrator. His playing, coaching & administrative career was the Balmain club in Sydney.

Career
Originally from Figtree, New South Wales, Patton was a flying winger and prolific try scorer who played twelve seasons for the Balmain club between 1937 and 1948.  

He was the first player in the club's history to score more than 100 tries (in all grades). He was also a top class sprinter during the late 1930s, and placed third in the Stawell Gift in 1937. He also competed in the race in 1938 and 1939.

Patton won three premierships with Balmain : 1944 (as captain), 1946 and 1947. He is regarded as one of the greatest ever Balmain players.

Post playing
Patton coached Balmain in 1952 and 1953, and later became the Balmain Club Secretary in 1973.

Death
Patton died of cancer on 20 April 1990 aged 73.

Accolades
In 2007, Patton was named in the Balmain team of the century.

References

1916 births
1990 deaths
Australian rugby league administrators
Australian rugby league players
Balmain Tigers coaches
Balmain Tigers players
City New South Wales rugby league team players
Country New South Wales rugby league team players
Rugby league players from Wollongong
Rugby league wingers